The University of Medellín Theater is a 1,702-seat theater, the largest in Medellín, Colombia. It has hosted national and international plays and shows. Entertainers such as Cats, Chespirito, Mayumaná, Emma Shapplin, Los Vivancos, Raphael, José Luis Perales, Paloma San Basilio, and Bajofondo have performed there.

History 
The Theatre opened on 26 September 1985. In tribute to the originator of the project, the theater was baptized "Gabriel Botero Obregón" in 1988. Initially, the theater was for exclusive use by the University, but as it became larger, the school made it available for public performances.

External links (Spanish) 
 Página oficial Universidad de Medellín
 Página del Teatro

Theatres in Medellín